Novonikolsky is a rural locality (a settlement) in Novochigolskoye Rural Settlement, Talovsky District, Voronezh Oblast, Russia. The population was 109 as of 2010. There are 3 streets.

Geography 
Novonikolsky is located 14 km west of Talovaya (the district's administrative centre) by road. Vasilyevsky is the nearest rural locality.

References 

Rural localities in Talovsky District